Kim Ji-sung may refer to:
 Kim Ji-sung (footballer)
 Kim Ji-sung (actress)